Morris Chesney "Skip" Strode (June 5, 1960 - April 17, 2021) was an American professional tennis player.

During Strode's career he won 1 doubles title. He achieved a career-high singles ranking of world No. 98 in 1983 and a career-high doubles ranking of world No. 47 in 1983.

Career finals

Singles (2 losses)

Doubles (1 win)

References

External links
 
 

American male tennis players
Sportspeople from El Cajon, California
Tennis people from California
American people of German descent
1960 births
2021 deaths
20th-century American people